Sir Lancelot Storr (18 January 18747 August 1944) was a British Army officer and an assistant war cabinet secretary during World War I.  He served on the personal staff of  Lord Kitchener at the War Office (1914-1916), and as a secretary on the Committee of Imperial Defence (1916-1921).  With Kitchener's help, Storr was transferred to the staff of Sir Maurice Hankey at the end of 1916, as part of the reforms promised by Prime Minister David Lloyd George.  Working on Hankey's staff, he served as assistant secretary to the British War Cabinet (1916), the Imperial War Cabinet (1917-1918), and the British Section of the Supreme War Council at Versailles (1917-1918) during World War I.  Along with Hankey and assistant war cabinet secretary Leo Amery, Storr is prominently featured in the Imperial War Cabinet photograph of 1917.  He was knighted and retired from the Army in 1921.

Footnotes

References 
 Amery, Leo, My Political Life, Vol II, War and Peace 1914-1929, London: Hutchinson, 1953
 Hankey, Maurice, The Supreme Command, Volume Two, London: Allen & Unwin, 1961
 Who Was Who, 1941-1950, Vol IV, London: Adam & Charles Black, 1952

Further reading 
 UK National Archives: Imperial War Cabinet Minutes

1874 births
1944 deaths